The Belt and Road Initiative (BRI, or B&R), known within China as the One Belt One Road or OBOR for short, is a global infrastructure development strategy adopted by the Chinese government in 2013 to invest in more than 150 countries and international organizations. It is considered a centerpiece of the Chinese leader Xi Jinping's foreign policy. The BRI forms a central component of Xi's "Major Country Diplomacy" strategy, which calls for China to assume a greater leadership role for global affairs in accordance with its rising power and status. It has been compared to the American Marshall Plan. , 151 countries were listed as having signed up to the BRI.

Xi originally announced the strategy as the "Silk Road Economic Belt" during an official visit to Kazakhstan in September 2013. "Belt" is short for the "Silk Road Economic Belt," referring to the proposed overland routes for road and rail transportation through landlocked Central Asia along the famed historical trade routes of the Western Regions; whereas "road" is short for the "21st Century Maritime Silk Road", referring to the Indo-Pacific sea routes through Southeast Asia to South Asia, the Middle East and Africa. Examples of Belt and Road Initiative infrastructure investments include ports, skyscrapers, railroads, roads, bridges, airports, dams, coal-fired power stations, and railroad tunnels.

The initiative was incorporated into the Constitution of China in 2018. The Xi Jinping Administration calls the initiative "a bid to enhance regional connectivity and embrace a brighter future." The project has a target completion date of 2049, which will coincide with the centennial of the People's Republic of China (PRC)'s founding.

Numerous studies conducted by the World Bank have estimated that BRI can boost trade flows in 149 participating countries by 4.1 percent, as well as cutting the cost of global trade by 1.1 percent to 2.2 percent, and grow the GDP of East Asian and Pacific developing countries by an average of 2.6 to 3.9 percent. According to London-based consultants Centre for Economics and Business Research, BRI is likely to increase the world GDP by $7.1 trillion per annum by 2040, and that benefits will be "widespread" as improved infrastructure reduces "frictions that hold back world trade". CEBR also concludes that the project will be likely to attract further countries to join, if the global infrastructure initiative progresses and gains momentum.

Supporters praise the BRI for its potential to boost the global GDP, particularly in developing countries. However, there has also been criticism over human rights violations and environmental impact, as well as concerns of debt-trap diplomacy resulting in neocolonialism and economic imperialism. These differing perspectives are the subject of active debate.

Objectives

Background

The initiative was unveiled by general secretary of the Chinese Communist Party (CCP) and paramount leader Xi Jinping in September and October 2013 during visits to Kazakhstan and Indonesia, and was thereafter promoted by Chinese premier Li Keqiang during state visits to Asia and Europe. The initiative was given intensive coverage by Chinese state media, and by 2016 had become often featured in the People's Daily.

The stated objectives are "to construct a unified large market and make full use of both international and domestic markets, through cultural exchange and integration, to enhance mutual understanding and trust of member nations, resulting in an innovative pattern of capital inflows, talent pools, and technology databases." The Belt and Road Initiative addresses an "infrastructure gap" and thus has the potential to accelerate economic growth across the Asia Pacific, Africa and Central and Eastern Europe. A report from the World Pensions Council (WPC) estimates that Asia, excluding China, requires up to US$900 billion of infrastructure investments per year over the next decade, mostly in debt instruments, 50% above current infrastructure spending rates. The gaping need for long term capital explains why many Asian and Eastern European heads of state "gladly expressed their interest to join this new international financial institution focusing solely on 'real assets' and infrastructure-driven economic growth".

The initial focus has been infrastructure investment, education, construction materials, railway and highway, automobile, real estate, power grid, and iron and steel. Already, some estimates list the Belt and Road Initiative as one of the largest infrastructure and investment projects in history, covering more than 68 countries, including 65% of the world's population and 40% of the global gross domestic product as of 2017. The project builds on the old trade routes that once connected China to the west, Marco Polo and Ibn Battuta's routes in the north and the maritime expedition routes of Ming dynasty admiral Zheng He in the south. The Belt and Road Initiative now refers to the entire geographical area of the historic "Silk Road" trade route, which has been continuously used in antiquity. Development of the Renminbi as a currency of international transactions, development of the infrastructures of Asian countries, strengthening diplomatic relations whilst reducing dependency on the US and creating new markets for Chinese products, exporting surplus industrial capacity, and integrating commodities-rich countries more closely into the Chinese economy are all objectives of the BRI.

While some countries, especially the United States, view the project critically because of possible Chinese influence, others point to the creation of a new global growth engine by connecting and moving Asia, Europe and Africa closer together.

The G7 industrial country Italy has been a partner in the development of the project since March 2019. According to estimates, the entire project today affects more than 60% of the world's population and approximately 35% of the global economy. Trade along the Silk Road could soon account for almost 40% of total world trade, with a large part being by sea. The land route of the Silk Road also appears to remain a niche project in terms of transport volume in the future.

In the maritime silk road, which is already the route for more than half of all containers in the world, deepwater ports are being expanded, logistical hubs are being built and new traffic routes are being created in the hinterland. The maritime silk road runs with its connections from the Chinese coast to the south, linking Hanoi, Kuala Lumpur, Singapore, and Jakarta, then westward linking the Sri Lankan capital city of Colombo, and Malé, capital of the Maldives, and onward to East Africa, and the city of Mombasa, in Kenya. From there the linkage moves northward to Djibouti, through the Red Sea and the Suez Canal to the Mediterranean, thereby linking Haifa, Istanbul, and Athens, to the Upper Adriatic region to the northern Italian hub of Trieste, with its international free port and its rail connections to Central Europe and the North Sea.

As a result, Poland, the Baltic States, Northern Europe, and Central Europe are also connected to the maritime silk road and logistically linked to East Africa, India and China via the Adriatic ports and Piraeus. All in all, the ship connections for container transports between Asia and Europe will be reorganized. In contrast to the longer East Asian traffic via north-west Europe, the southern sea route through the Suez Canal towards the junction Trieste shortens the goods transport by at least four days.

In connection with the Silk Road project, China is also trying to network worldwide research activities.

Simon Shen and Wilson Chan have compare the initiative to the post-World War II Marshall Plan.

Project name 
The official name for the initiative is the Silk Road Economic Belt and 21st-Century Maritime Silk Road Development Strategy, which was initially abbreviated as the One Belt One Road or the OBOR strategy. The English translation has been changed to the Belt and Road Initiative (BRI) since 2016, when the Chinese government considered the emphasis on the words "one" and "strategy" were prone to misinterpretation so they opted for the more inclusive term "initiative" in its translation. However, "One Belt One Road" is still the reference term in Chinese-language media.

International relations
The Belt and Road Initiative is believed by some analysts to be a way to extend Chinese economic and political influence. Some geopolitical analysts have couched the Belt and Road Initiative in the context of Halford Mackinder's heartland theory. Scholars have noted that official PRC media attempts to mask any strategic dimensions of the Belt and Road Initiative as a motivation. China has already invested billions of dollars in several South Asian countries like Pakistan, Nepal, Sri Lanka, Bangladesh and Afghanistan to improve their basic infrastructure, with implications for China's trade regime as well as its military influence. This project can also become a new economic corridor for different regions. For example, in the Caucasus region, China considered cooperations with Armenia from May 2019. Chinese and Armenian sides had multiple meetings, signed contracts, initiated a north–south road program to solve even infrastructure-related aspects.

China has emerged as one of the fastest-growing sources of Foreign Direct Investment (FDI) into Indiait was the 17th largest in 2016, up from the 28th rank in 2014 and 35th in 2011, according to India's official ranking of FDI inflows.

Western regions
BRI's goals include internal state-building and stabilisation of ethnic unrest for its vast inland western regions such as Xinjiang and Yunnan, linking these less developed regions, with increased flows of international trade facilitating closer economic integration with China's inland core.

Leadership 
A leading group was formed sometime in late 2014, and its leadership line-up publicized on 1 February 2015. This steering committee reports directly into the State Council of China and is composed of several political heavyweights, evidence of the importance of the program to the government. Then Vice-Premier Zhang Gaoli, who was also a member of the 7-man CCP Politburo Standing Committee, was named leader of the group, and Wang Huning, Wang Yang, Yang Jing, and Yang Jiechi named deputy leaders.

On 28 March 2015, China's State Council outlined the principles, framework, key areas of cooperation and cooperation mechanisms with regard to the initiative. The BRI is considered a strategic element within the foreign policy of China, and was incorporated into its constitution in 2017.

With regard to China and the African countries, the Forum on China-Africa Cooperation (FOCAC) is a significant multi-lateral cooperation mechanism for facilitating BRI projects. The China-Arab States Cooperation Forum (CASCF) serves a similar coordinating role with regard to BRI projects in the Arab states.

Financing

Asian Infrastructure Investment Bank (AIIB)

The Asian Infrastructure Investment Bank, first proposed in October 2013, is a development bank dedicated to lending for infrastructure projects. As of 2015, China announced that over one trillion yuan (US$160  billion) of infrastructure-related projects were in planning or construction.

The primary goals of AIIB are to address the expanding infrastructure needs across Asia, enhance regional integration, promote economic development and improve public access to social services.

The Articles of Agreement (the legal framework) of AIIB were signed in Beijing on 29 June 2015. The proposed bank has an authorized capital of $100 billion, 75% of which will come from Asia and Oceania. China will be the single largest stakeholder, holding 26.63% of voting rights. The board of governors is AIIB's highest decision-making body. The bank began operation on 16 January 2016, and approved its first four loans in June.

Silk Road Fund

In November 2014, CCP leader Xi Jinping announced a US$40 billion development fund, which would be separate from the banks and not part of the CPEC investment. The Silk Road Fund would invest in businesses rather than lend money to the projects. The Karot Hydropower Project,  from Islamabad, Pakistan, is the first project. The Chinese government has promised to provide Pakistan with at least US$350 million by 2030 to finance this station. The Sanxia Construction Corporation commenced work in January 2016.

Debt sustainability
In 2017, China joined the G20 Operational Guidelines for Sustainable Financing and in 2019 to the G20 Principles for Quality Infrastructure Investment. The Center for Global Development described China's New Debt Sustainability Framework as "virtually identical" to the World Bank's and IMF's own debt sustainability framework.

According to Carmen Reinhart, the World Bank's chief economist, 60% of the lending from Chinese banks is to developing countries where sovereign loans are negotiated bilaterally, and in secret. China is the largest bilateral lender in the world. Loans are backed by collateral such as rights to a mine, a port or money.

However, the term itself has come under scrutiny as analysts and researchers have pointed out that there is no evidence to prove that China is deliberately aiming to do debt trap diplomacy. Research from Deborah Brautigam, an international political economy professor at Johns Hopkins University, and Meg Rithmire, an associate professor at Harvard Business School, have disputed the allegations of Debt Trap Diplomacy by China and pointed out that "Chinese banks are willing to restructure the terms of existing loans and have never actually seized an asset from any country, much less the port of Hambantota". They argued that it was 'long overdue' for people to know the truth and not to have it be "willfully misunderstood".

For China itself, a report from Fitch Ratings doubts Chinese banks' ability to control risks, as they do not have a good record of allocating resources efficiently at home. This may lead to new asset quality problems for Chinese banks where most funding is likely to originate. Additionally, two state-owned banks oversee China's foreign loans and development.

It has been suggested by some scholars that critical discussions about an evolving BRI and its financing needs transcend the "debt-trap" meme. This concerns the networked nature of financial centers and the vital role of advanced business services (e.g. law and accounting) that bring agents and sites into view (such as law firms, financial regulators, and offshore centers) that are generally less visible in geopolitical analysis, but vital in the financing of BRI.

The COVID-19 pandemic has stopped work on some projects, while some have been scrapped; focus has been brought on projects that were already of questionable economic viability before the pandemic. Many of the loans agreed upon are in or nearing technical default, as many debtor countries reliant on exporting commodities have seen a slump in demand for them. Some debtor countries have started to negotiate to defer payments falling due. In particular, the African continent owes an estimated $145 billion, much of which involves BRI projects, with $8bn falling due in 2020. Many leaders on the continent are demanding debt forgiveness, and The Economist forecasts a wave of defaults on these loans.

In April 2020, in light of the pandemic, the Group of 20 decided to freeze debt payments for countries that would struggle to pay them. Interest on Chinese loans continued to accrue during the freeze. In June 2020, Chinese leader Xi Jinping decided to cancel interest-free loans for certain African countries. Since 2000, these types of loans have accounted for 2 to 3 percent of total loans China has issued to African countries. Furthermore, foreign aid is a controversial topic in China due to it having its own areas with significant poverty.

Infrastructure networks
The Belt and Road Initiative is about improving the physical infrastructure through land corridors that roughly equate to the old Silk Road. The Silk Road, or Silk Roads, has proven to be a productive but at the same time elusive concept, increasingly used as an evocative metaphor. With China's ‘Belt and Road Initiative’, it has found fresh invocations and audiences.
These are the belts in the name, and there is also a maritime silk road. Infrastructure corridors spanning some 60 countries, primarily in Asia and Europe but also including Oceania and East Africa, will cost an estimated US$4–8 trillion. The initiative has been contrasted with the two US-centric trading arrangements, the Trans-Pacific Partnership and the Transatlantic Trade and Investment Partnership. The initiative projects receive financial support from the Silk Road Fund and the Asian Infrastructure Investment Bank while they are technically coordinated by the B&R Summit Forum. The land corridors include:
 The New Eurasian Land Bridge, which runs from Western China to Western Russia through Kazakhstan, and includes the Silk Road Railway through China's Xinjiang Autonomous Region, Kazakhstan, Russia, Belarus, Poland and Germany.
 Another corridor will run from Northern China through Mongolia to the Russian Far East. The Russian government-established Russian Direct Investment Fund and China's China Investment Corporation, a Chinese government investment agency, partnered in 2012 to create the Russia-China Investment Fund, which concentrates on opportunities in bilateral integration.
 The China–Central Asia–West Asia Corridor, which will run from Western China to Turkey.
 The China-Indochina Peninsula economic corridor, which will run from Southern China to Singapore.
 The Trans-Himalayan Multi-dimensional Connectivity Network, which will turn Nepal from a landlocked to a land-linked country.
 The China–Pakistan Economic Corridor (CPEC) (Chinese:中国-巴基斯坦经济走廊) which is also classified as "closely related to the Belt and Road Initiative", a US$62 billion collection of infrastructure projects throughout Pakistan which aims to rapidly modernize Pakistan's transportation networks, energy infrastructure, and economy. On 13 November 2016, CPEC became partly operational when Chinese cargo was transported overland to Gwadar Port for onward maritime shipment to Africa and West Asia. CPEC and Gwadar port infrastructure is particularly significant because it opens routes independent of the Malacca strait.
This kind of connectivity is the focus of BRI efforts because China's significant economic growth has been supported by exports and the overland import of major quantities of raw materials and intermediate components. By 2022, China had built cross-border highways and expressway networks to almost every nearby region. It also built direct rail service, the usage of which surged after the COVID-19 pandemic congested air freight and sea shipping, and hampered port access.

Silk Road Economic Belt
China's leader Xi Jinping visited Astana, Kazakhstan, and Southeast Asia in September and October 2013, and proposed jointly building a new economic area, the Silk Road Economic Belt (SREB). The "belt" includes countries on the original Silk Road through Central Asia, West Asia, the Middle East, and Europe. The initiative would create a cohesive economic area by building both hard infrastructure such as rail and road links and soft infrastructure such as trade agreements and a common commercial legal structure with a court system to police the agreements. It would increase cultural exchanges and expand trade. Besides a zone largely analogous to the historical Silk Road, an expansion includes South Asia and Southeast Asia.

Many of the countries in this belt are also members of the China-led Asian Infrastructure Investment Bank (AIIB).

Three belts are proposed. The North belt would go through Central Asia and Russia to Europe. The Central belt passes through Central Asia and West Asia to the Persian Gulf and the Mediterranean. The South belt runs from China through Southeast Asia and South Asia and on to the Indian Ocean through Pakistan. The strategy will integrate China with Central Asia through Kazakhstan's Nurly Zhol infrastructure program.

21st Century Maritime Silk Road

The "21st Century Maritime Silk Road" (Chinese:21世纪海上丝绸之路), or just the Maritime Silk Road, is the sea route 'corridor.' It is a complementary initiative aimed at investing and fostering collaboration in Southeast Asia, Oceania and Africa through several contiguous bodies of water: the South China Sea, the South Pacific Ocean, and the wider Indian Ocean area. It was first proposed in October 2013 by Xi Jinping in a speech to the Indonesian Parliament. As with the Silk Road Economic Belt initiative, most member countries have joined the Asian Infrastructure Investment Bank.

The maritime Silk Road runs with its links from the Chinese coast to the south via Hanoi to Jakarta, Singapore and Kuala Lumpur through the Strait of Malacca via the Sri Lankan Colombo opposite the southern tip of India via Malé, the capital of the Maldives, to the East African Mombasa, from there to Djibouti, then through the Red Sea over the Suez Canal into the Mediterranean, there via Haifa, Istanbul and Athens to the Upper Adriatic to the northern Italian junction of Trieste with its international free port and its rail connections to Central Europe and the North Sea.

According to estimates in 2019, the land route of the Silk Road remains a niche project and the bulk of the Silk Road trade continues to be carried out by sea. The reasons are primarily due to the cost of container transport. The maritime Silk Road is also considered to be particularly attractive for trade because, in contrast to the land-based Silk Road leading through the sparsely populated Central Asia, there are on the one hand far more states on the way to Europe and, on the other hand, their markets, development opportunities, and population numbers are far larger. In particular, there are many land-based links such as the Bangladesh-China-India-Myanmar Corridor (BCIM). Due to the attractiveness of this now subsidized sea route and the related investments, there have been major shifts in the logistics chains of the shipping sector in recent years. Due to its unique geographical location, Myanmar is viewed to be playing a pivotal role for China's BRI projects.

From the Chinese point of view, Africa is important as a market, raw material supplier and platform for the expansion of the new Silk Roadthe coasts of Africa should be included. In Kenya's port of Mombasa, China has built a rail and road connection to the inland and to the capital Nairobi. To the northeast of Mombasa, a large port with 32 berths including an adjacent industrial area including infrastructure with new traffic corridors to South Sudan and Ethiopia is being built. A modern deep-water port, a satellite city, an airfield and an industrial area are being built in Bagamoyo, Tanzania. Further towards the Mediterranean, the Teda Egypt special economic zone is being built near the Egyptian coastal town of Ain Sochna as a joint Chinese-Egyptian project.

As part of its Silk Road strategy, China is participating in large areas of Africa in the construction and operation of train routes, roads, airports and industry. In several countries such as Zambia, Ethiopia and Ghana, dams have been built with Chinese help. In Nairobi, China is funding the construction of the tallest building in Africa, the Pinnacle Towers. With the Chinese investments of 60 billion dollars for Africa announced in September 2018, on the one hand, sales markets are created and the local economy is promoted, and, on the other hand, African raw materials are made available for China.

One of the Chinese bridgeheads in Europe is the port of Piraeus. Overall, Chinese companies are to invest a total of 350 million euros directly in the port facilities there by 2026 and a further 200 million euros in associated projects such as hotels. In Europe, China wants to continue investing in Portugal with its deep-water port in Sines, but especially in Italy and there at the Adriatic logistics hub around Trieste. Venice, the historically important European endpoint of the maritime Silk Road, has less and less commercial importance today due to the shallow depth or silting of its port.

The international free zone of Trieste provides in particular special areas for storage, handling and processing as well as transit zones for goods. At the same time, logistics and shipping companies invest in their technology and locations in order to benefit from ongoing developments. This also applies to the logistics connections between Turkey and the free port of Trieste, which are important for the Silk Road, and from there by train to Rotterdam and Zeebrugge. There is also direct cooperation, for example between Trieste, Bettembourg, and the Chinese province of Sichuan. While direct train connections from China to Europe, such as from Chengdu to Vienna overland, are partially stagnating or discontinued, there are (as of 2019) new weekly rail connections between Wolfurt or Nuremberg and Trieste or between Trieste, Vienna and Linz on the maritime Silk Road.

There are also extensive intra-European infrastructure projects to adapt trade flows to current needs. Concrete projects (as well as their financing), which are to ensure the connection of the Mediterranean ports with the European hinterland, are decided among others at the annual China-Central-East-Europe summit, which was launched in 2012. This applies, for example, to the expansion of the Belgrade-Budapest railway line, the construction of the high-speed train between Milan, Venice and Trieste and connections on the Adriatic-Baltic and Adriatic-North Sea axis. Poland, the Baltic States, Northern Europe and Central Europe are also connected to the maritime Silk Road through many links and are thus logistically networked via the Adriatic ports and Piraeus to East Africa, India and China. Overall, the ship connections for container transports between Asia and Europe will be reorganized. In contrast to the longer East Asia traffic via northwest Europe, the south-facing sea route through the Suez Canal towards the Trieste bridgehead shortens the transport of goods by at least four days.

According to a study by the University of Antwerp, the maritime route via Trieste dramatically reduces transport costs. The example of Munich shows that the transport there from Shanghai via Trieste takes 33 days, while the northern route takes 43 days. From Hong Kong, the southern route reduces transport to Munich from 37 to 28 days. The shorter transport means, on the one hand, better use of the liner ships for the shipping companies and, on the other hand, considerable ecological advantages, also with regard to the lower CO2 emissions, because shipping is a heavy burden on the climate. Therefore, in the Mediterranean area, where the economic zone of the Liverpool–Milan Axis meets functioning railroad connections and deep-water ports, there are significant growth zones. Henning Vöpel, Director of the Hamburg World Economic Institute, recognizes that the North Range (i.e. transport via the North Sea ports to Europe) is not necessarily the one that will remain dominant in the medium term.

From 2025, the Brenner Base Tunnel will also link the upper Adriatic with southern Germany. The port of Trieste, next to Gioia Tauro the only deep water port in the central Mediterranean for container ships of the seventh generation, is therefore a special target for Chinese investments. In March 2019, the China Communications Construction Company (CCCC) signed agreements to promote the ports of Trieste and Genoa. Accordingly, the port's annual handling capacity will be increased from 10,000 to 25,000 trains in Trieste (Trihub project) and a reciprocal platform to promote and handle trade between Europe and China will be created. It is also about logistics promotion between the North Adriatic port and Shanghai or Guangdong. This also includes a state Hungarian investment of 100 million euros for a 32 hectare logistics center and funding from the European Union of 45 million euros in 2020 for the development of the railway system in the port city. Furthermore, the Hamburg port logistics group HHLA invested in the logistics platform of the port of Trieste (PLT) in September 2020. In 2020, Duisburger Hafen AG (Duisport), the world's largest intermodal terminal operator, took a 15% stake in the Trieste freight terminal. There are also further contacts between Hamburg, Bremen and Trieste with regard to cooperation. There are also numerous collaborations in the Upper Adriatic, for example with the logistics platform in Cervignano. In particular, the area of the upper Adriatic is developing into an extended intersection of the economic areas known as the Blue Banana and the Golden Banana. The importance of the free port of Trieste will continue to increase in the coming years due to the planned port expansion and the expansion of the Baltic-Adriatic railway axis (Semmering Base Tunnel, Koralm Tunnel and in the wider area Brenner Base Tunnel).

Ice Silk Road
In addition to the Maritime Silk Road, Russia and China are reported to have agreed to jointly build an 'Ice Silk Road' along the Northern Sea Route in the Arctic, along a maritime route within Russian territorial waters.

China COSCO Shipping Corp. has completed several trial trips on Arctic shipping routes, and Chinese and Russian companies are cooperating on oil and gas exploration in the area and to advance comprehensive collaboration on infrastructure construction, tourism and scientific expeditions.

Russia together with China approached the practical discussion of the global infrastructure project Ice Silk Road. This was stated by representatives of Vnesheconombank at the International conference Development of the shelf of Russia and the CIS — 2019 (Petroleum Offshore of Russia), held in Moscow.

The delegates of the conference were representatives of the leadership of Russian and corporations (Gazprom, Lukoil, Rosatom, Rosgeologiya, Vnesheconombank, Morneftegazproekt, Murmanshelf, Russian Helicopters, etc.), as well as foreign auditors (Deloitte, member of the world Big Four) and consulting centers (Norwegian Rystad Energy and others.).

Super grid
The super grid project aims to develop six ultra high voltage electrical grids across China, Northeast Asia, Southeast Asia, South Asia, Central Asia and West Asia. The wind power resources of Central Asia would form one component of this grid.

Additionally proposed
The Bangladesh–China–India–Myanmar Economic Corridor (BCIM) was proposed to run from southern China to Myanmar and was initially officially classified as "closely related to the Belt and Road Initiative". Since the second Belt and Road Forum in 2019, BCIM has been dropped from the list of projects due to India's refusal to participate in the Belt and Road Initiative.

Projects 

China has engaged 149 countries and 30 international organisations in the BRI. Infrastructure projects include ports, railways, highways, power stations, aviation and telecommunications. The flagship projects include the China–Pakistan Economic Corridor, the Boten–Vientiane railway in Laos and Khorgas land port.

Ecological issues 
The Belt and Road initiative has attracted attention and concern from environmental organizations. A joint report by the World Wide Fund for Nature and HSBC argued that the BRI presents significant risks as well as opportunities for sustainable development. These risks include the overuse of natural resources, the disruption of ecosystems, and the emission of pollutants. Coal-fired power stations, such as Emba Hunutlu power station in Turkey, are being built as part of BRI, thus increasing greenhouse gas emissions and global warming. Glacier melting as a result of excess greenhouse gas emissions, endangered species preservation, desertification and soil erosion as a result of overgrazing and over farming, mining practices, water resource management, and air and water pollution as a result of poorly planned infrastructure projects are some of the ongoing concerns as they relate to Central Asian nations.

A point of criticism of the BRI overall relates to the motivation of pollution and environmental degradation outsourcing to poorer nations, whose governments will disregard the consequences. In Serbia for instance, where pollution-related deaths already top Europe, the presence of Chinese-owned coal-powered plants have resulted in an augmentation in the country's dependency on coal, as well as air and soil pollution in some towns.

According to German environmental group Urgewald, China's energy companies will make up nearly half of the new coal plant generation expected to go online in the next decade. BRI coal projects accounted for as much as 42% of China's overseas investment in 2018, and 93% of energy investments of the BRI-linked Silk Road Fund go to fossil fuels.

The development of port infrastructure and increasing shipping associated with the maritime Belt and Road Initiative could impact sensitive species and marine habitats like coral reefs, mangroves, seagrass meadows and saltmarsh.

In the opening of the 2017 Belt and Road Forum for International Cooperation, Chinese leader Xi Jinping stated that the BRI should "pursue the new vision of green development and a way of life and work that is green, low-carbon, circular and sustainable" in accordance with the goals of the 2030 Agenda for Sustainable Development. A report by the United Nations Development Programme and CCIEE frame the BRI as an opportunity for environmental protection so long as it is used to provide green trade, finance, and investment in alignment with each country's implementation of the Sustainable Development Goals. Other proposals include providing financial support for BRI member countries aiming to fulfill their contribution to the Paris Agreement, or providing resources and policy expertise to aid the expansion of renewable energy sources such as solar power in member countries.

The Belt and Road Initiative International Green Development Coalition (BRIGC) was launched during the 2nd Belt and Road Forum for International Cooperation in April 2019. It aims to "integrate sustainable development, in particular environmental sustainability, international standards and best practices, across the... priorities of the Belt and Road Initiative". However, many scholars are unsure whether these best practices will be implemented. All BRI-specific environmental protection goals are outlined in informal guidelines rather than legally binding policies or regulations. Moreover, member nations may choose to prioritize economic development over environmental protections, leading them to neglect to enforce environmental policy or lower environmental policy standards. This could cause member nations to become "pollution havens" as Chinese domestic environmental protections are strengthened, though evidence of this currently happening is limited.

In September 2021, China's paramount leader Xi Jinping announced that his country will "step up support" for developing countries to adopt "green and low-carbon energy" and will no longer be financing overseas coal-fired power plants.

Human rights accusations
According to a report by American NGO China Labor Watch, there are widespread human rights violations concerning Chinese migrant workers sent abroad. The Chinese companies allegedly "commit forced labor" and usually confiscate the workers' passports once they arrive in another country, make them apply for illegal business visas and threaten to report their illegal status if they refuse to comply, refuse to give adequate medical care and rest, restrict workers' personal freedom and freedom of speech, force workers to overwork, cancel vacations, delay the payment of wages, publish deceptive advertisements and promises, browbeat workers with high amount of damages if they intend to leave, provide bad working and living conditions, punish workers who lead protests and so on.

Reactions and criticism

Support
To date, more than 130 countries have issued endorsements. Moscow has been an early partner of China, and Russia and China now have altogether 150 common projects including natural gas pipelines and the Polar Silk Road. In March 2015, Russia's First Deputy Prime Minister Igor Shuvalov asserted that "Russia should not view the Silk Road Economic Belt as a threat to its traditional, regional sphere of influence […] but as an opportunity for the Eurasian Economic Union".

In June 2016, China's leader Xi Jinping visited Poland and met with Poland's President Andrzej Duda and Prime Minister Beata Szydło, saying that "Polish companies will benefit hugely" from Belt and Road Initiative. Duda and Xi signed a declaration on strategic partnership in which they reiterated that Poland and China viewed each other as long-term strategic partners.

As a wealthy country, Singapore does not need massive external financing or technical assistance for domestic infrastructure building, but has repeatedly endorsed the BRI and cooperated in related projects in a quest for global relevance and to strengthen economic ties with BRI recipients. It is also one of the largest investors in the project. Furthermore, there is a strategic defensive factor: making sure a single country is not the single dominant factor in Asian economics.

While the Philippines historically has been closely tied to the United States, China sought its support for the BRI in terms of the quest for dominance in the South China Sea. The Philippines adjusted its policy in favor of Chinese claims in the South China Sea under President Rodrigo Duterte.

In 2017, Yanis Varoufakis, the former Greek Minister of Finance, wrote in Project Syndicate that his experience with the Belt and Road Initiative has been highly encouraging. He remarked that the Chinese authorities managed to combine their sense of self-interest with a patient investment attitude and a genuine commitment to negotiate over and over again, in order to achieve a mutually advantageous agreement.

In April 2019 and during the second Arab Forum for Environment and Development, China engaged in an array of partnerships called "Build the Belt and Road, Share Development and Prosperity" with 18 Arab countries. The general stand of African countries sees BRI as a tremendous opportunity for independence from foreign aid and influence.

Greece, Croatia, and 14 other Eastern European countries are already dealing with China within the framework of the BRI. In March 2019, Italy was the first member of the Group of Seven nations to join the BRI. The new partners signed a Memorandum of Understanding worth €2.5 billion across an array of sectors such as transport, logistics, and port infrastructure.

Despite initially criticising BRI, the former Malaysian Prime Minister Mahathir Mohamad pledged support for the BRI project in 2019. He stated that he was fully in support of the Belt and Road Initiative and that his country would benefit from BRI. “Yes, the Belt and Road idea is great. It can bring the land-locked countries of Central Asia closer to the sea. They can grow in wealth and their poverty reduced,” Mahathir said.

Russian political scientist Sergey Karaganov, who is considered close to Russian President Vladimir Putin, has advocated for a united Sino-Russian strategy to unify a Eurasian bloc. He argues that the Eurasian Economic Union (EEU) and China's Belt and Road Initiative will work together to promote economic integration throughout the region.

Opposition
Some observers and skeptics, mainly from non-participant countries, including the United States, interpret it as a plan for a sinocentric international trade network. In response the United States, Japan, and Australia had formed a counter initiative, the Blue Dot Network in 2019, followed by the G7's Build Back Better World initiative in 2021.

The United States proposes a counter-initiative called the "Free and Open Indo-Pacific strategy" (FOIP). US officials have articulated the strategy as having three pillarssecurity, economics, and governance. At the beginning of June 2019, there has been a redefinition of the general definitions of "free" and "open" into four stated principlesrespect for sovereignty and independence; peaceful resolution of disputes; free, fair, and reciprocal trade; and adherence to international rules and norms.

Government officials in India have repeatedly objected to China's Belt and Road Initiative. In particular, they believe the "China–Pakistan Economic Corridor" (CPEC) project ignores New Delhi's essential concerns about its sovereignty and territorial integrity.

Former Malaysian prime minister Mahathir Mohamad had initially found the terms of BRI to be too harsh for most countries and recommended countries avoid joining the BRI, but has changed his stance since.

Mixed
Vietnam historically has been at odds with China, so it has been indecisive about supporting or opposing BRI.

South Korea has tried to develop the "Eurasia Initiative" (EAI) as its own vision for an east–west connection. In calling for a revival of the ancient Silk Road, the main goal of President Park Geun-hye was to encourage a flow of economic, political, and social interaction from Europe through the Korean Peninsula. Her successor, President Moon Jae-in announced his own foreign policy initiative, the "New Southern Policy" (NSP), which seeks to strengthen relations with Southeast Asia.

While Italy and Greece have joined the Belt and Road Initiative, other European countries have voiced ambivalent opinions. German chancellor Angela Merkel declared that the BRI "must lead to a certain reciprocity, and we are still wrangling over that bit". In January 2019 French president Emmanuel Macron said: "the ancient Silk Roads were never just Chinese … New roads cannot go just one way." European Commission Chief Jean-Claude Juncker and Japanese Prime Minister Shinzo Abe signed an infrastructure agreement in Brussels in September 2019 to counter China's Belt and Road Initiative and link Europe and Asia to coordinate infrastructure, transport and digital projects.

In 2018, the premier of the south-eastern Australian state of Victoria, Daniel Andrews, signed a memorandum of understanding on the Belt and Road Initiative to establish infrastructure ties and further relations with China. Home Affairs Minister Peter Dutton described the BRI as "a propaganda initiative from China" that brings an "enormous amount of foreign interference", while arguing that "Victoria needs to explain why it is the only state in the country that has entered into this agreement". Prime Minister Scott Morrison said Victoria was stepping into federal government policy territory, stating "We didn't support that decision at the time [the Victoria State Government and the National Development and Reform Commission of the People's Republic of China] made [the agreement]. And national interest issues on foreign affairs are determined by the federal government, and I respect their jurisdiction when it comes to the issues they're responsible for and it's always been the usual practice for states to respect and recognise the role of the federal government in setting foreign policy". In April 2021, Foreign Minister Marise Payne declared Australia would pull out of the Belt and Road Initiative, cancelling Victoria's agreements signed with China, and pulling out of the "Belt and Road" initiative completely. The federal government's decision to veto the deal reflected the increasingly soured relationship between the Australian Government and the Chinese Government, after China's alleged attempts to employ economic coercion in response to the Australian Government's support for an inquest into the origins of COVID-19, as well as the Australian Government's decision to support the US in several regional disputes opposing China, such as the issue of Taiwan or the South China Sea.

Accusations of neo-imperialism and debt-trap diplomacy

Accusations 
There has been concern over the project being a form of neo-colonialism. Some governments have accused the Belt and Road Initiative of being neocolonial due to what they allege is China's practice of debt-trap diplomacy to fund the initiative's infrastructure projects. The idea of debt trap diplomacy was created by an Indian think tank before being expanded on by papers by two Harvard students, which gained media attention.

China contends that the initiative has provided markets for commodities, improved prices of resources, and thereby reduced inequalities in exchange, improved infrastructure, created employment, stimulated industrialization, and expanded technology transfer, thereby benefiting host countries.

Tanzanian President John Magufuli said the loan agreements of BRI projects in his country were "exploitative and awkward." He said Chinese financiers set "tough conditions that can only be accepted by mad people," because his government was asked to give them a guarantee of 33 years and an extensive lease of 99 years on a port construction. Magufuli said Chinese contractors wanted to take the land as their own but his government had to compensate them for drilling the project construction.

Indian commentator S. K. Chatterji considers debt traps an economic dimension of China's salami slice strategy. According to Chatterji, China's sovereignty slicing tactic dilutes the sovereignty of the target nations mainly using the debt trap. An example provided is Beijing pressuring Tajikistan to handover 1,158 km2 territory, which still owes China US$1.2bn out of a total US$2.9bn of debt. Other nations with a similar risk of sovereignty slicing are Pakistan, Madagascar, Mongolia, Maldives, Kyrgyzstan, Montenegro, Sri Lanka, and Laos which have borrowed large sums from China.

In May 2021, DRC’s President Félix Tshisekedi called for a review of mining contracts signed with China by his predecessor Joseph Kabila, in particular the Sicomines multibillion-dollar 'minerals-for-infrastructure' agreement.
China's plans to link its western Xinjiang province to Gwadar in the Balochistan province of Pakistan with its US$500m investment in the Gwadar Port has met resistance from local fishermen protesting against Chinese trawlers and illegal fishing.

Rebuttals 
Deborah Bräutigam, a professor at the School of Advanced International Studies (SAIS) at Johns Hopkins University, described the debt-trap diplomacy theory as a "meme" that became popular due to "human negativity bias" based on anxiety about the rise of China. A 2019 research paper by Bräutigam revealed that most of the debtor countries voluntarily signed on to the loans and had positive experiences working with China, and "the evidence so far, including the Sri Lankan case, shows that the drumbeat of alarm about Chinese banks' funding of infrastructure across the BRI and beyond is overblown" and "a large number of people have favorable opinions of China as an economic model and consider China an attractive partner for their development." She said that the theory lacked evidence and criticized the media for promoting a narrative that "wrongfully misrepresents the relationship between China and the developing countries that it deals with," highlighting the fact that Sri Lanka owed more to Japan, the World Bank, and the Asian Development Bank than to China. A 2018 China Africa Research Initiative report, co-authored by Bräutigam, remarked that "Chinese loans are not currently a major contributor to debt distress in Africa."

According to New York-based economist Anastasia Papadimitriou, partnering countries are equally responsible when making deals with China. China's alleged "neocolonialist intentions" can be disproved by Sri Lanka's Hambantota Port project on the southeast coast of Sri Lanka, one of the most cited examples of "Debt-trap diplomacy". After an analysis of the Belt and Road Initiative, Papadimitriou concludes that it is "not so much neocolonialism, rather it is economic regionalism". Additionally, The Royal Institute of International Affairs, a London-based international affairs think tank, asserted that the debt crisis in Sri Lanka was unrelated to Chinese lending, but was instead caused mainly from "the misconduct of local elites and Western-dominated financial markets". It was confirmed by Lowy Institute. A 2019 report by the Lowy Institute said that China had not engaged in deliberate actions in the Pacific which justified accusations of debt-trap diplomacy (based on contemporaneous evidence), and China had not been the primary driver behind rising debt risks in the Pacific; the report expressed concern about the scale of the country's lending, however, and the institutional weakness of Pacific states which posed the risk of small states being overwhelmed by debt. A 2020 Lowy Institute article called Sri Lanka's Hambantota International Port the "case par excellence" for China's debt-trap diplomacy, but called the narrative a "myth" because the project was proposed by former Sri Lankan president Mahinda Rajapaksa, not Beijing. The article added that Sri Lanka's debt distress was not caused by Chinese lending, but by "excessive borrowing on Western-dominated capital markets."

The Rhodium Group, an American research company, analyzed Chinese debt renegotiations and concluded that China's leverage in them are often exaggerated and realistically limited in power. The findings of their study frequently showed an outcome in favor of the borrower rather than the supposedly predatory Chinese lender. The firm found that "asset seizures are a very rare occurrence" and that instead debt write-off was the most common outcome.

Darren Lim, senior lecturer at the Australian National University, said that the "debt-trap diplomacy" claim was never credible, despite the Trump administration pushing it. Dawn C. Murphy, Professor of International Security Studies at the U.S. Air War College, concludes that describing China's behavior as "neocolonialist" is an "exaggeration and misrepresentation."

According to political scientist and researcher Zhexin Zhang, the overwhelming enthusiasm of developing countries in the Belt and Road Initiative, as seen first in the "Belt and Road Forum for International Cooperation" held in May 2017, is sufficient enough to invalidate the neo-colonialism argument.

A March 2018 study released by the Center for Global Development, a Washington-based think tank, remarks that between 2001 and 2017, China restructured or waived loan payments for 51 debtor nations, the majority of BRI participants, without seizing state assets. In September 2018, W. Gyude Moore, a former Liberian public works minister and senior policy fellow at the Center for Global Development, stated that "[t]he language of “debt-trap diplomacy” resonates more in Western countries, especially the United States, and is rooted in anxiety about China's rise as a global power rather than in the reality of Africa." He also stated that "China has been a net positive partner with most African countries.”
According to Pradumna Bickram Rana and Jason Ji Xianbai of Singapore's Nanyang Technological University, although there is a number of implementation issues confronting the Belt and Road Initiative mostly due to the COVID-19 Pandemic, China's alleged debt-trap diplomacy "more myth than reality". While they acknowledge that various countries are facing difficulties in paying their debts to China, they highlight China's willingness to help these countries restructure their debt through forgiving policies, such as partial debt relief. In eleven cases, China postponed loans for indebted countries, one being Tonga.

Belt and Road educational community 
Along with policy coordination, facilities connectivity, unimpeded trade and financial integration, people-to-people bonds are among the five major goals of BRI. BRI educational component implies mutual recognition of qualifications, academic mobility and student exchanges, coordination on education policy, life-long learning, and development of joint study programmes. To this end, Xi Jinping announced plan to allocate funds for additional 30000 scholarships for SCO citizens and 10000 scholarships for the students and teachers along the Road. Among the BRI cooperation priorities is also strengthening people-to-people ties through academic mobility, research cooperation, and student exchanges. Since the beginning of the BRI, China has occupied a key role in shaping how academic, and skilled migration in general, develops along the BRI and increased efforts to attract and retain foreign talents.

The University Alliance of the Silk Road centered at Xi'an Jiaotong University aims to support the Belt and Road initiative with research and engineering, and to foster understanding and academic exchange. A French think tank, Fondation France Chine (France-China Foundation), focused on the study of the New Silk Roads, was launched in 2018. It is described as pro–Belt and Road Initiative and pro-China.

See also 

 Belt and Road Forum for International Cooperation
 Asia-Africa Growth Corridor
 Asian Highway Network
 Blue Banana
 Forum on China-Africa Cooperation
 China-Arab States Cooperation Forum
 Blue Dot Networkcounter-initiative by the United States
 Build Back Better Worldcounter-initiative by the G7
 Eurasian Land Bridge
Eurasia Continental Bridge corridor
 Golden Banana
 International North–South Transport Corridor
 List of the largest trading partners of China
 Maritime Silk Road
 Trans-Asian Railway
 List of ports and harbours of the Atlantic Ocean
 Ports of the Baltic Sea
 Channel Portsports and harbours of the English Channel
 List of North Sea portsports of the North Sea and its influent rivers
 List of coastal settlements of the Mediterranean Sea
 List of ports and harbors of the Arctic Ocean
 List of ports and harbours of the Indian Ocean
 List of ports and harbors of the Pacific Ocean
 Southern OceanSee :Category: Ports and harbors of Antarctica
 Iceports
 Ice pierMcMurdo Station
 Silk Road

References

Further reading

 
 Cai, Peter. Understanding China's belt and road initiative (Lowy Institute 2017) online.
 Calabrese, L. (2019): Making the Belt and Road Initiative work for Africa. London: Overseas Development Institute.
 Calabrese, L. (2019): China and global development: what to read ahead of the Belt and Road Forum. London: Overseas Development Institute.
 Chansok, L. (2019): The Belt and Road Initiative and Cambodia's Infrastructure Connectivity Development: A Cambodian Perspective. Cheung FM and Hong Y-Y (eds) Regional Connection under the Belt and Road Initiative. The prospects for Economic and Financial Cooperation. London: Routledge, pp. 134–163.
 Chen, Yaowen, et al. "Does the Connectivity of the Belt and Road Initiative Contribute to the Economic Growth of the Belt and Road Countries?." Emerging Markets Finance and Trade 55.14 (2019): 3227–3240.
 
  online review.
 He, Baogang. "Chinese expanded perceptions of the region and its changing attitudes toward the Indo-Pacific: A hybrid vision of the institutionalization of the Indo-Pacific." East Asia 35.2 (2018): 117–132.
 Ito, Asei. "China's Belt and Road Initiative and Japan's Response: from Non-participation to Conditional Engagement." East Asia 36.2 (2019): 115–128.

 Kohli, Harinder S., Johannes F. Linn, and Leo M. Zucker, eds. China's Belt and Road Initiative: Potential Transformation of Central Asia and the South Caucasus (Sage, 2019).
 Lai, Karen P.Y., Shaun Lin and James D. Sidaway. "Financing the Belt and Road Initiative (BRI): Research agendas beyond the “debt-trap” discourse." Eurasian Geography and Economics61.2 (2020): 109–124. online.
 
 Lin, Shaun and Carl Grundy-Warr. "Navigating Sino-Thai ‘rocky’ bilateral ties: The geopolitics of riverine trade in the Greater Mekong Subregion.” Environment and Planning C: Politics and Space 38.5 (2020): 826–833.
Lin, Shaun, Naoko Shimazu and James D. Sidaway. "Theorising from the Belt and Road Initiative (一带一路)." Asia Pacific Viewpoint https://onlinelibrary.wiley.com/doi/abs/10.1111/apv.12322
 Lin, Shaun, James D. Sidaway and Woon Chih Yuan. "Reordering China, respacing the world: Belt and Road Initiative (一带一路) as an emergent geopolitical culture." The Professional Geographer 71.3 (2019): 507–522. online.
 
Park, Albert. Which Countries Have Benefited the Most from China's Belt and Road Initiative?. (No. 2019-32. HKUST Institute for Emerging Market Studies, 2019) online.
 Scissors, Derek. "The Belt and Road is Overhyped, Commercially." AEI Paper & Studies (American Enterprise Institute, 2019) online
 
 
Sidaway, James D. and Chih Yuan Woon. "Chinese narratives on “One Belt, One Road” (一带一路) in geopolitical and imperial contexts." The Professional Geographer 69.4 (2017) 591-603. online.
Belt and Road Initiative: China's Most Important Project, 14 July 2022
 
 
 
Wahlquist, Hakan. "Albert Herrmann: A missing link in establishing the Silk Road as a concept for Trans-Eurasian networks of trade” Environment and Planning C: Politics and Space 38.5 (2020): 803–808.
 
 World Pensions Council (WPC) policy paper: Chinese Revolution Could Lure Overseas Investment, Dow Jones Financial News, 12 October 2015.
 The New York Times – "Behind China's $1 Trillion Plan", 13 May 2017.

External links

 Official website by State Council
 Official website by Office of the Leading Group for the Belt and Road Initiative 

 
Year of establishment missing
Foreign direct investment
Foreign relations of China
Chinese investment abroad
Xi Jinping
Li Keqiang